The Dâmbovița Center (also named Casa Radio) is an unfinished building in Bucharest, Romania, near Cotroceni, on the shore of the Dâmbovița River. Casa Radio (meaning Radio House) was erected during the late 1980s by the Communist regime on land which before the Second World War was the location of the Bucharest Hippodrome. The building was intended to serve as a museum of the Romanian Communist Party. The balcony (which no longer exists) of the unfinished building facing Știrbei Vodă Street was used by the Romanian dictator Nicolae Ceaușescu on 23 August 1989 to watch the festivities marking Romania's National Day. It was the last Communist-style parade in Romania.

The Romanian government contracted the construction of a hotel and a mall called "Dâmbovița Center" to the Turkish company Cenk Vefa Kucuk. The project was supposed to be a $275 million investment and the largest multipurpose complex in the region. It was supposed to build a 300-room hotel, 69,000 m2 of retail spaces, 16,000 m2 of offices, 45,000 m2 of commercial galleries and a residential complex, designed to include 200 apartments, a parking lot, restaurants and a hospital. The government, which provided the building, would get only 10% of the income.

The government canceled the contract in 2005 because of various irregularities regarding the auction, the company and the financing. The company said it would sue to recover the money already invested.

In the winter of 2006, a public-private partnership agreement between Elbit Medical Imaging, an Israeli company, and the Romanian government was announced to develop Casa Radio. The Romanian Government will remain a 15% partner in the scheme. Construction began in June 2007, after a decision to demolish 70% of the initial building, keeping only the façade and the structural framework.

Plaza Centers, the developer of Casa Radio in Bucharest entered in 2013 judicial reorganization under the protection of the Dutch bankruptcy law, the Israeli investor Mordechay Zisser announced. Plaza Centers intends to invest in Romania in projects with a total value of nearly EUR 2 billion, the largest of projects being Dâmbovița Center, built on the  platform of Casa Radio. In July 2014, Plaza Centers successfully completed debt restructuring and emerges from reorganization proceeding, and after 2014 it sold Kragujevac Plaza in Serbia and a shopping center in India.

 GLA shopping mall and indoor leisure center, approximately  GBA of offices, hotel complex with conference center and underground car parking spaces. The Company Plaza Centers expected to complete the first phase of the project, which includes the shopping center, parking and PAB, in 2017.

References

External links
 Plaza Centers redevelopment

Unfinished buildings and structures in Romania
Buildings and structures in Bucharest